The 2021–22 EFL Trophy, known as the Papa Johns Trophy for sponsorship reasons, the 39th season in the history of the competition, was a knock-out tournament for clubs in EFL League One and League Two, the third and fourth tiers of the English football league system, as well as the "Academy teams" of 16 Premier League clubs with Category One status.

Rotherham United won the title after beating Sutton United 4–2 after extra time in the final on 3 April 2022. Sunderland were the defending champions, but they were knocked out in the Second Round by Oldham Athletic.

Participating clubs 
48 clubs from League One and League Two.
16 invited Category One Academy teams.

Eligibility criteria for players
For EFL clubs
Minimum of four qualifying outfield players in their starting XI. A qualifying outfield player was one who met any of the following requirements:
Any player who started the previous or following first-team fixture.
Any player who is in the top 10 players at the club who has made the most starting appearances in league and domestic cup competitions this season.
Any player with forty or more first-team starting appearances in their career, including International matches.
Any player on loan from a Premier League club or any EFL Category One Academy club.
A club can play any eligible goalkeeper in the competition.
Any player out on a long loan term at a National League, National League North, or National League South team can play as long as the loaning team agree to allow the player to return for the match.

For invited teams
Minimum of six players in the starting line-up who are aged under 21 on 30 June 2021.
Maximum of two players on the team sheet who are aged over 21 and have also made forty or more senior appearances.

Competition format
Group stage
 Sixteen groups of four teams were organised on a regionalised basis.
 All groups included one invited club.
 All clubs played each other once, either home or away (Academies played all group matches away from home).
 Clubs were awarded three points for a win and one point for a draw.
 In the event of a drawn game (after 90 minutes), a penalty shoot-out was held with the winning team earning an additional point.
 Clubs expelled from the EFL were knocked out of the tournament automatically.
 The top two teams in each group progressed to the knockout stage.

Knockout stage
 Round 2 and 3 of the competition were drawn on a regionalised basis.
 In Round 2, the group winners were seeded and the group runners-up were unseeded in the draw.
 In Round 2, teams who played in the same group as each other in the group stage were kept apart from each other.

Group stage

Northern Section

Group A

Group B

Group C

Group D

Group E

Group F

Group G

Group H

Southern Section

Group A

Group B

Group C

Group D

Group E

Group F

Group G

Group H

Round 2
The draw for the Second Round took place on Saturday 13 November 2021.

Northern section

Southern section

Round 3

Northern section

Southern section

Quarter-finals
The draw for the quarter-final stage took place live on Talksport on 6 January 2022 with games taking place during the week commencing 24 January. From this stage onwards, the competition is no longer split between a northern section and a southern section.

Semi-finals
The draw for the semi-final stage took place live on Sky Sports on 29 January 2022 with games taking place during the week commencing 6 March.

Final

External links
 EFL Trophy section of official English Football League website

References

EFL Trophy
EFL Trophy
2021–22 English Football League